The Flatirons are rock formations in the western  United States, near Boulder, Colorado, consisting of flatirons. There are five large, numbered Flatirons ranging from north to south (First through Fifth, respectively) along the east slope of Green Mountain (elev. ), and the term "The Flatirons" sometimes refers to these five alone.  Numerous additional named Flatirons are on the southern part of Green Mountain, Bear Peak, and among the surrounding foothills.

Etymology

The Flatirons were known as the "Chautauqua Slabs" c. 1900 and "The Crags" c. 1906. There are two hypotheses regarding the origin of the current name, one based on resemblance to old-fashioned clothes irons, the other based on resemblance to the Flatiron Building completed in 1902.

Geology
The Flatirons consist of conglomeratic sandstone of the Fountain Formation. Geologists estimate the age of these rocks as 290 to 296 million years; they were lifted and tilted into their present orientation between 35 and 80 million years ago, during the Laramide Orogeny. The Flatirons were subsequently exposed by erosion.  Other manifestations of the Fountain Formation can be found in many places along the Colorado Front Range, including Garden of the Gods near Colorado Springs, Roxborough State Park in Douglas County, and Red Rocks Amphitheatre near Morrison.

Climbing
The Flatirons on Green Mountain are within the City of Boulder Open Space and Mountain Parks system. They are popular destinations for hikers and rock climbers, with rock grades ranging from easy (5.0) to world-class (5.14b). Of note is the East Face Standard route on the Third Flatiron; guidebook author and longtime climber Richard Rossiter calls it "The best 5.4 in the solar system."

A symbol of Boulder

Images of the numbered Flatirons on Green Mountain are ubiquitous symbols of the city of Boulder. The area abounds with Flatirons photographs, drawings, paintings, and sculptures. The city government, the University of Colorado, and many businesses make use of this symbol in their logos, advertisements, and marketing materials. Many businesses also use the word Flatirons or Flatiron in their names. In addition, Boulder often is referred to in the tech industry as the "Silicon Flatirons", analogous to Santa Clara Valley's famous nickname.

The third Flatiron bore a "CU," for the University of Colorado, in  white letters from the 1950s until 1980, when the city painted over the initials to restore the natural look of the stone formation.  
CU students Dale Johnson and Robert Rowlands climbed the flatiron one night in November 1949 to paint the original "C." The "C" was removed and painted again, with a "U" being added in the 1950s. The letters are still faintly visible under the reddish paint used by the city in 1980.

Gallery

References

External links

Climbing according to summitPost.org
Geology
Flatiron Webcam
360 Degree Panoramas Near Flat Irons

Fountain Formation
Landmarks in Colorado
Climbing areas of Colorado
Landforms of Boulder County, Colorado